Commuter rail forms a vital part of public transportation in major Australian cities.

Definitions 
The Commonwealth government Bureau of Infrastructure, Transport and Regional Economics and industry peak body Australasian Railway Association, who jointly publish the Trainline statistical report, do not define "commuter rail" networks, and instead categorise passenger systems as "urban" or "non-urban". 

Urban networks are further classified as "light rail" or "heavy rail". Light rail includes the tram networks in Melbourne and Adelaide continuously operating in various forms since the late 20th century, as well as networks in other cities newly constructed after the cessation of tram operation. Both types of light rail are described at Trams in Australia and are not included in this article. Heavy rail networks primarily describe passenger operations over parts of mixed-traffic rail systems centred on capital cities, but also include the independent Sydney Metro system.

Non-urban passenger networks are classified according to their passenger task. "Inter-city" or "regional" networks are defined to be those whose primary market "...include[s] daily commuting or day return business or leisure travel" and are thus included in this article. Other markets, such as long-distance operations between cities and regional centres, tourist-focused and heritage services, are excluded.

Summary of commuter rail systems 
Average daily patronage, where possible, is taken from the last calendar or financial year. System lengths are given in route kilometres. The largest, most extensive urban (as distinct from interurban) system is found in Melbourne, while the systems with the highest and most dense patronage are found in Sydney.

References 

Passenger rail transport in Australia